The 1948 Michigan State Normal Hurons football team represented Michigan State Normal College (later renamed Eastern Michigan University) during the 1948 college football season. In their 26th and final season under head coach Elton Rynearson, the Hurons compiled a 3–5 record and were outscored by their opponents, 114 to 66. Claire E. Ebersole was the team captain.

Rynearson retired as head football coach after the 1948 season after 26 years in that position. He remained the school's athletic director. In his 26 years as head football coach, Rynearson compiled a record of 114–58–15 (.648), and his teams outscored their opponents, 2,574 to 1,415.

Schedule

References

Michigan State Normal
Eastern Michigan Eagles football seasons
Michigan State Normal Hurons football